Lou Halmy (June 23, 1911 – March 14, 2005) was a jazz musician and music arranger. In the 1930s he played trumpet with Shep Fields and His Rippling Rhythm Orchestra and appeared with the orchestra in the film The Big Broadcast of 1938. For most of his career he worked as an arranger and transcriber of musical compositions including such notable songs as "Thanks for the Memory" (1938),  "Louie Louie" (1955), "Tequila" (1958), and "Raindrops Keep Fallin' on My Head" (1969). In all, the United States Copyright Office records 274 entries for Halmy between 1951 and 2003. Halmy was also a virtuosic whistler, which was a talent he employed as a transcriber and as a performer.

References

External links
.

1911 births
2005 deaths
American jazz trumpeters
Jazz arrangers
Hungarian emigrants to the United States